Papua New Guinea is divided into two time zones, namely:

 Papua New Guinea Standard Time (UTC+10:00), which covers most of Papua New Guinea except the Autonomous Region of Bougainville.
 Bougainville Standard Time (UTC+11:00), which covers the Autonomous Region of Bougainville.

IANA time zone database 
The IANA time zone database gives Papua New Guinea two time zones, Pacific/Bougainville and Pacific/Port Moresby.

References

Time in Oceania
Science and technology in Papua New Guinea
Standards